The Azerbaijan national under-19 football team is the national football team of Azerbaijan and is controlled by the Association of Football Federations of Azerbaijan.

Competition history
In 2014, the team under management of Nicolai Adam managed to qualify for 2015 UEFA European Under-19 Championship in Greece.

UEFA European Under-19 Football Championship

Fixtures and results

2020 UEFA European Under-19 Championship

Qualifying round

Group 7

2016 UEFA European Under-19 Football Championship First Round qualification

2017 UEFA European Under-19 Football Championship First Round qualification

2017 Valentin Granatkin Memorial Cup

2018 UEFA European Under-19 Football Championship First Round qualification

2019 UEFA European Under-19 Football Championship First Round qualification

2019 UEFA European Under-19 Football Championship Elite Round qualification

Current squad
 The following players were called up for the friendly matches.
 Match dates: 2 and 4 June 2021
 Opposition:  and Caps and goals correct as of:''' 27 January 2021, after the match against .

Coaching staff

See also
 Azerbaijan national football team
 Azerbaijan national under-23 football team
 Azerbaijan national under-21 football team
 Azerbaijan national under-20 football team
 Azerbaijan national under-18 football team
 Azerbaijan national under-17 football team

References

European national under-19 association football teams
Under-19
Youth football in Azerbaijan
National, under-19